Dragon Fist, also known as Dangsang Martial Arts or The Wild Big Boss, is a 1979 Hong Kong martial arts film directed and produced by Lo Wei, starring Jackie Chan, Nora Miao and James Tien. The film was released in Hong Kong on 21 April 1979.

Plot
Tang How-yuen (Jackie Chan) is a disciple of kung fu master San-thye. San-thye wins a martial arts tournament, only to be killed by evil kung fu master, Master Li (Yen Shi-kwan). Tang tries unsuccessfully to fight Chung, and leaves the evil master unharmed. Tang, along with San-thye's wife and daughter head after the killer to seek revenge. When they find him, Chung has repented and has cut off his own leg as penance. The master's widow becomes ill, so Tang goes to work for a gang in order to get her medicine. However, whilst in their employ, he is blamed for the death of a young boy, and San-Thye's widow is poisoned. Tang and the one-legged master join forces to defeat the evil lord who poisoned San-thye's widow.

Cast
 Jackie Chan as Tang How-yuen
 Hsu Hsia as Master King
 Ouyang Sha-fei as Master King's wife
 Nora Miao as Zhuang Meng-lan
 Yen Shi-kwan as Master Li
 Pearl Lin - Zhong Qiu-ping
 James Tien as Fang Gang
 Eagle Han-ying as Nan Qing
 Ko Keung as Master Wing
 Chui Yuen as Wing's student
 Wong Kwong-yue as Wing's assistant
 Chui Fat as Wing's assistant
 Peng Kang as Wing's student
 Wang Yao as Wing's student

Production
Like Chan's Spiritual Kung Fu, Dragon Fist was filmed in South Korea in early 1978 but was unable to be released or produced because the studio went bankrupt and was running out of money. As a result, both Lo Wei productions only had cost-cutting measures after Chan returned from his loan deal with Seasonal Films, where he made Snake in the Eagle's Shadow and Drunken Master alongside director Yuen Woo-ping. During the production, Chan reportedly had his nose broken repeatedly, joking "Do you think I was born with this nose?" Unlike most of Jackie Chan's early films, Dragon Fist had a more serious tone, with little in the way of comedic moments.

Like many other Hong Kong kung fu films, the film was scored with various musical cues from American films, mainly Jerry Goldsmith's 1966 score for The Sand Pebbles.

Box office
The film was released in Hong Kong on 21 April 1979. The film grossed 1,004,000 at the Hong Kong box office in 1979. Overseas, the film sold 103,261 tickets in Seoul City (South Korea) and 142,785 tickets in France (where it was released in 1982), for a combined  tickets sold overseas in Seoul and France.

Home media
 On 15 February 2001, Seven 7 released the French language theatrical version DVD entitled Le Poing De La Vengeance, with an aspect ratio of 2.35:1. It contains no other language options.
 On 22 October 2001, Eastern Heroes released the film in the UK on DVD, uncut (except for many frame-cuts). However, it's poorly cropped from 2.35:1 into 1.78:1 and only contains an English dub.
 On 4 June 2002, Columbia Tri-Star released the film in the US on DVD, in Full Frame with English and Cantonese language options. However, it contains a heavily edited version produced by Aquarius Releasing (roughly 15 minutes missing) and is dubtitled.
 On 24 February 2006, Universal Japan released the film in Japan on DVD, in 2.35:1 and with a Cantonese soundtrack. This version was the first completely uncut release on DVD, however, it does not feature any English subtitles.
 On 11 June 2007, Hong Kong Legends released the film in the UK on DVD, in 2.35:1 and uncut in Cantonese language with newly translated English subtitles.
 In 2018, UK company 88 Films released the film on Blu-ray. It contains the original Mandarin, Cantonese, and English language tracks in mono and in a newly remastered 5.1 DTS-HD MA format. The blu-ray also contains subtitles for each track option. It is uncut and remastered in genuine HD.

See also
 Jackie Chan filmography
 Southern Dragon Kung Fu
 List of Hong Kong films
 List of martial arts films

References

External links
 Dragon Fist at Hong Kong Cinemagic
 
 

1979 films
1979 martial arts films
Films directed by Lo Wei
Hong Kong martial arts films
Kung fu films
1970s Mandarin-language films
Wushu films
Films shot in South Korea
1970s Hong Kong films